Love Marriage  (2008) is the debut novel by author V. V. Ganeshananthan set in Sri Lanka and North America. Published by Random House in April 2008, Love Marriage was named one of the Washington Post Book World's Best of 2008 and appeared on the longlist for the Orange Prize. It was also selected as a Barnes & Noble Discover Great New Writers Pick. Ganeshananthan began the novel as part of her senior thesis at Harvard University under the direction of Jamaica Kincaid. In a series of vignettes, Ganeshananthan's novel chronicles how Sri Lankan politics have affected and continue to affect a particular family.  Its narrator, Yalini, is a young woman born to Sri Lankan parents in New York on July 23, 1983—the same day as one of the most violent episodes in the Sri Lankan Civil War, Black July. The novel follows Yalini and her family from suburban America to Toronto, where they reunite with an uncle who has left Sri Lanka after a life of militancy with the Tamil Tigers.

References

See also

2008 American novels
Novels set in Sri Lanka
Novels by V. V. Ganeshananthan
2008 debut novels